Lilly Englert (born 23 August 1989) is an English actress best known for The Wilde Wedding, A Midsummer Night's Dream and Ask for Jane.

Early life and education 
Englert was born in London, England and raised in Parma, Italy along with four younger siblings. In 2010, she relocated to New York City to train at the Stella Adler Studio of Acting.

Career 
In 2013, Englert made her Off-Broadway debut in Julie Taymor's A Midsummer Night's Dream at Theatre for a New Audience. She received rave reviews for her performance as Hermia opposite Kathryn Hunter's Puck, with The New York Times' Ben Brantley praising her "knockout comic performance as a sexually teasing Hermia," and The Hollywood Reporter calling her "dizzy Hermia" the "standout". The production was later made into a feature film with limited theatrical release.

Shortly after the run of A Midsummer Night's Dream, Englert was cast in Theatre for a New Audience's Off-Broadway production of King Lear in the role of Cordelia opposite Michael Pennington, again garnering positive acclaim as a "youthfully severe Cordelia" with "a faun-like vulnerability". She then played Cissy Franks in the MCC Theater's Off-Broadway run of the English play Punk Rock to positive reviews.

In 2016, Englert played the role of Marina in Theatre for a New Audience's Off-Broadway production of Pericles.

Englert made her professional film debut in the 2017 romantic comedy film The Wilde Wedding opposite Patrick Stewart, Glenn Close, John Malkovich, Minnie Driver and Orange Is the New Black's Yael Stone. In 2017, she also performed in the Off-Broadway world premiere of Fuck Marry Kill. The play was developed at the Lincoln Center Lab and Playwrights Horizons in New York City.

She will appear in the 2018 historical drama film Ask for Jane. The film is based on the true story of the Jane Collective.

Filmography

Film 

|2019 
Piccole donne

Television

References

External links 
 

Living people
Actresses from London
Stella Adler Studio of Acting alumni
English stage actresses
English film actresses
English actresses
21st-century English actresses
1989 births